Izydor Redler (25 November 1902 – 7 April 1981) was a Polish footballer. He played in one match for the Poland national football team in 1926.

References

External links
 

1902 births
1981 deaths
Polish footballers
Poland international footballers
Place of birth missing
Association footballers not categorized by position